Go Soeda was the defending champion but chose not to compete.
Top seed Lu Yen-hsun won the title over Yuki Bhambri 6–4, 6–3.

Seeds

Draw

Finals

Top half

Bottom half

References
 Main Draw
 Qualifying Draw

OEC Kaohsiung - Singles
2013 Singles
2013 in Taiwanese tennis